The Korean State Railway (Kukch'ŏl) operates a wide variety of electric, diesel and steam locomotives, along with a variety of electric multiple unit passenger trains. Kukch'ŏl's motive power has been obtained from various sources. Much, mostly steam and Japanese-made electric locomotives, was inherited from the Chosen Government Railway (commonly known as Sentetsu), the South Manchuria Railway (Mantetsu) and various privately owned railways of the colonial era. Many steam locomotives were supplied by various communist countries in the 1950s, including the Soviet Union, Czechoslovakia, Hungary, Poland, Romania, and China.

Most electric locomotives were made in North Korea by the Kim Chŏng-tae Electric Locomotive Works, as new construction of domestic designs or rebuilds of older units; however, many diesel locomotives have been converted to electric operation at the same factory. Apart from small diesel switchers and draisines, almost all diesel and steam locomotives were manufactured outside North Korea.

Due to ongoing economic difficulties in North Korea, maintenance levels are poor; locomotive serviceability is estimated at 50%. However, recently a major campaign to improve the operation and appearance of rolling stock and infrastructure, and a modernisation of the electric locomotive fleet has begun following an order issued by Kim Jong-un.

Classification system
The Korean State Railway's classification system presently uses a two-character type designator and a class number.

Initially steam and electric locomotives used a modification of the system used by Sentetsu prior to war's end; however, instead of using Japanese numbers, this class number was based on Korean numbers, and the two-syllable type designations were converted from Japanese katakana to Chosŏn'gŭl. This was nearly identical to the post-war system used Korean National Railroad in South Korea, though the KNR used Roman numerals instead of Korean numbers, and slightly different Koreanisations of the Japanese type name.

The numbers one through four were taken from traditional Korean numerals, the rest were from Sino-Korean numerals.

Thus, a Sentetsu ミカサ ("Mikasa") class steam locomotive became 미가서 ("Migasŏ") under the new system.

Sentetsu's system of classifying electric locomotives wasn't retained; instead, all electric locomotives were simply given the type designator 전기 (chŏngi, "electric"). Thus, the four classes of electric locomotive that were inherited thus became Chŏngiha, "Electric 1" (from 하나, hana, "one"); 전기두, Chŏngidu, "Electric 2" (from 둘, tul, "two"); 전기서, Chŏngisŏ, "Electric 3" (from 셋, set, "three"); and 전기너, Chŏnginŏ, "Electric 4" (from 넷, net, "four"). With the arrival of new electrics from Czechoslovakia in the late 1950s, this system was continued with the Chŏngi-5 series (전기5).

However, after the introduction of the Red Flag 1-class locomotives (which were given their name by Kim Il-sung), all subsequent electric locomotives received the 붉은기 (Pulg'ŭn'gi, "Red Flag") designation, followed by a three or four-digit serial number; this applies to all classes intended for mainline use, even if they have a different class name (e.g. the Ch'ŏngnyŏnjŏl Kinyŏm-class). The exception to this is the Kanghaenggun-class (강행군, "Forced March") locomotives, which are numbered 1.5-01 through 1.5-11. Electric shunting locomotives carry only a running number.

Electric locomotives for narrow gauge lines, aside from the pre-war Chŏnginŏ class, are marked with their class name or line they're used on, followed by a serial number, e.g. Charyŏk Kaengsaeng-3 or Sinhŭngsŏn-02.

Later, around the late 1960s or early 1970s, a system similar to that introduced for electric locomotives was applied to steam and diesel locomotives. Steam locomotives were universally given the type designator 증기 (Chŭnggi, "steam") and diesel locomotives 내연 (Naeyŏn, "internal combustion"), along with a three- (for mainline diesels) or four-digit (for shunting diesels and all steam engines) serial number, with diesel locomotives are numbered sequentially within their number series. On steam locomotives, the first of the new four-digit serial number reflects the former type designator (부러 → 1, 미가 → 6, 마더 → 7; the others are unknown, and the 8000 series is applied to steam locomotives of foreign origin supplied as war aid during the Korean War); the second digit reflects the former type-series, directly translating the number, e.g. 미가서 became 6300, 마더하 became 7100. The last two digits are the locomotive's original running number  (last three digits, in the case of the Migaha class numbered into the 6000 and 6100 series). The system behind determining which numeral represents which type designator (that is, why Miga became "6", etc.) is unclear, as this numeral has no relation to anything obvious, e.g. number of powered axles, etc.

Electric multiple-unit trainsets appear to be classified like steam and diesel locomotives, using 전기 (Chŏngi, "electric") as the type designator, followed by a three or four digit serial number, continuing the pattern set by the early electric locomotives. However, the actual application of this to the rolling stock is inconsistent, and there are many which carry only a running number. The numbering of the petrol and diesel railcars inherited from Sentetsu is unknown.

Standard-gauge electric locomotives
When Korea was partitioned following Japan's defeat in the Pacific War, it was the North who benefitted from Sentetsu's first electrification project. The first stretch of electrified track in Korea was the Pokkye-Kosan section of the former Kyŏngwŏn Line, electrification of which had been completed on 27 March 1944, and which after the partition was in the Northern half. Although electrification of the Chech'ŏn-P'unggi section of the Kyŏnggyŏng Line had been started in 1941, by the end of the war it was only 90% complete; this stretch was in the South after the partition.

By the end of the war, of the 26 electric locomotives that had been ordered by Sentetsu, only nine had been delivered; of these, eight were in operation on the electrified section of the Kyŏngwŏn Line, and one was in Seoul for repairs; when Sentetsu's rolling stock was officially divided in 1947, this split of electric locomotives was formalised as well.

Electrification work resumed after the end of the war, and in 1948, the electrification of two further stretches was completed: the mountainous section from Yangdŏk to Ch'ŏnsŏng on the P'yŏngra Line, and Kaegu to Koin on the Manp'o Line.

After the partition, the Allied General Headquarters (GHQ) in Tokyo ordered the delivery of a further ten electric locomotives to Korea as war reparations from Japan. Seven were eventually delivered, all to the South, based on the expectation that reunification would come quickly, and that the implementation of Sentetsu's electrification plans would continue. However, after the outbreak of the Korean War, during the occupation of much of the Korean Peninsula by the Korean People's Army seven of the eight electric locomotives were captured and taken to the north - the one unit that had been in Seoul for repairs at the time of Japan's surrender in the Pacific war, along with six of the seven units that had been delivered to the South from Japan after the partition. Thus, of the 16 electric locomotives that had been delivered from Japan, 15 ended up in the North after the end of the Korean War.

The Korean War left all of the electrification in Korea destroyed, and for several years the 15 electric locomotives in the North sat unused. The Korean State Railway had not abandoned its plans to electrify, however, and along with the general reconstruction of its severely damaged infrastructure, re-electrification of previously electrified lines and new electrification of other lines was begun, and in 1956, the electrification of the Yangdŏk-Ch'ŏnsŏng section of the P'yŏngra Line was restored. At the same time, the 15 Japanese-built electric locomotives were refurbished at the engine shops at Yangdŏk.

Electrification continued apace, and by 1964,  of the P'yŏngra Line, along with the entirety of the P'yŏngŭi Line, had been electrified. As part of the modernisation of the country's railways and the ever-expanding electrification of the network, new electric locomotives were ordered from Czechoslovakia. Later, a licence was obtained from Czechoslovakia, along with technology transfer, to manufacture electric locomotives at the Kim Chŏng-tae Electric Locomotive Works in P'yŏngyang, and all of North Korea's electric locomotives have been manufactured domestically since then.

The production of the domestically designed and produced Red Flag 1-class locomotives began in 1961. Since the beginning of the 1980s, much of the production of "new" locomotives has involved the refurbishment and upgrade of previously-built units, sometimes retaining the existing body, sometimes building new bodywork for the locomotive; such is the case some of the Pulgungi 5000-8/1 locomotives, which are built on older chassis, upgraded for higher performance, and enclosed in a newly built body.

Electric locomotive classes

Diesel locomotives
Due to North Korea's extensive coal deposits and hydroelectric power generation facilities, dieselisation hasn't been a priority for the Korean State Railway as it has been for many other railways. With ample coal supplies to fire steam locomotives, and electrification of the rail network being expanded rapidly after the Korean War, serious dieselisation didn't start until the 1960s, first with the arrival of 14 shunting locomotives from Hungary, followed by the first batch of the K62-class mainline diesels (the variant of the M62-type common throughout the former Communist bloc) from the Soviet Union in 1967. Though the Hungarian shunters are mostly gone, apart from a few that have been converted to electric operation, the K62s form the backbone of Kukch'ŏl's diesel fleet to this day.

Severe floods in the 1990s had taken their toll on North Korea's hydroelectric generation system, and even some mines had flooded - and due to electricity shortages caused by the silting of the dams, there was often little electricity available to run pumps needed to clear the water out of the mines. By the turn of the millennium, Kukch'ŏl was having difficulties keeping electric trains running, and the fleet of K62s was insufficient to meet the transportation needs, even though they'd dropped significantly due to ongoing economic difficulties. To alleviate this problem, more M62s from several European countries, along with a sizeable number of second-hand locomotives from China, were imported.

In recent years, extensive work has begun on refurbishing the rail network and power generation capabilities in the country, but diesels continue to play their significant role in hauling passenger and freight trains on the various mainlines.

Diesel locomotive classes

Electric multiple units

 100-series - Five DeRoHaNi-class combination 2nd and 3rd class electric railcars with baggage compartment originally built by Nippon Sharyō for the colonial-era Kŭmgangsan Electric Railway. One of these, number 102, is preserved at the P'yŏngyang Railway Museum.
 500-series - Former P'yŏngyang Metro trainsets, second-hand Type GI sets from Berlin, converted for operation as mainline EMUs by the Kim Chong-t'ae Works in 2001.
 Former P'yŏngyang Metro DK4 trainsets, built new for Pyongyang Metro by the Changchun Car Company of China in 1972, subsequently converted for operation as mainline EMUs by the Kim Chong-t'ae Works between 1995 and 2007.
 Juche - 4-section low-speed EMU built by Kim Chong-t'ae Works in 1976. At least two sets built, later it became 6 section after two cars were taken from the unknown EMU. These cars had their sliding doors replaced by swing doors, though their original purpose is given away by the door position, which unlike the original Juche cars, are not located at the end of each carriage.
 Red Flag 900-class - A unique combination electric locomotive with a section for carrying passengers built by the Kim Chong-t'ae Works.
Unknown 6-car EMU with two pantographs and outside hanging sliding doors.

Railcars
29 Keha-class petrol railcars were inherited from Sentetsu after the war. Very little is known about their service lives with Kukch'ŏl or their classification and numbering, but one was seen in service on the Pukpu Line in 2012.

There are also an unknown number of Qinling GC-160 and 'Sonbul' (선불) railbuses. The Sonbul originally ran a school service near Manpo, until the line was electrified. Currently, the school service is pulled by a BVG Class G.

Steam locomotives

References

Rail transport in North Korea
Locomotives of North Korea